The 2009 Zenith Tennis Cup was a professional tennis tournament played on outdoor red clay courts. It was part of the 2009 ATP Challenger Tour. It took place in Milan, Italy between 15 and 21 June 2009.

Singles entrants

Seeds

 Rankings are as of May 25, 2009.

Other entrants
The following players received wildcards into the singles main draw:
  Daniele Bracciali
  Fabio Colangelo
  Gianluca Naso
  Mariano Zabaleta

The following players received entry from the qualifying draw:
  Francesco Aldi
  Federico del Bonis
  Francesco Piccari
  Walter Trusendi

Champions

Singles

 Alessio di Mauro def.  Vincent Millot, 6–4, 7–6(3)

Doubles

 Yves Allegro /  Daniele Bracciali def.  Manuel Jorquera /  Francesco Piccari, 6–4, 6–2

References
Official website
ITF search 
2009 Draws

Zenith Tennis Cup
Aspria Tennis Cup
Clay court tennis tournaments